Scout may refer to:

Actual people:
 Scout Niblett, English singer-songwriter
 Scout Taylor-Compton, American actress
 Scout Tufankjian, Armenian-American photojournalist

Fictional characters:
 Scout Finch, protagonist in To Kill a Mockingbird by Harper Lee
 Scout, The first of the nine playable classes in the first person shooter released in 2007,Team Fortress 2